Chiang Chung-ling (21 September 1922 – 18 March 2015) was a Taiwanese army general, former Minister of Defense and Vice Chairman of the Kuomintang (Chinese Nationalist Party).

As Minister of Defense, he called for the use of Sky Horse missiles to rival Chinese M-class missiles. Also, several high-profile military deaths occurred during his term as Minister of Defense. When being questioned by reporters outside the parliament on September 19, 1995, he replied with a rhetorical question, "哪個地方不死人?" ("Where do people not die?"). His reply caused a sensation and public condemnation, and finally he apologized on September 25, 1995.

After a C-130H military transport plane crashed on October 10, 1997, near Taipei, Chiang Chung-ling resigned as Minister of Defense on October 11 to take responsibility for the crash, in which all five crew members died.

Death
In 2015, he died  at Taipei Veterans General Hospital, aged 92, of heart failure.

References

1922 births
2015 deaths
Politicians from Jinhua
Republic of China politicians from Zhejiang
Kuomintang politicians in Taiwan
Chinese emigrants to Taiwan
Taiwanese Ministers of National Defense
People from Yiwu
Generals from Zhejiang